Macalpinella is a genus of flies in the family Pseudopomyzidae.

Distribution
Taiwan.

Species
Macalpinella brevifacies Papp, 2005

References

Pseudopomyzidae
Brachycera genera
Diptera of Asia